Cuyahoga Valley National Park is an American national park that preserves and reclaims the rural landscape along the Cuyahoga River between Akron and Cleveland in Northeast Ohio.

The  park is administered by the National Park Service, but within its boundaries are areas independently managed as county parks or as public or private businesses. Cuyahoga Valley was originally designated as a National Recreation Area in 1974, then redesignated as a national park 26 years later in 2000, and remains the only national park that originated as a national recreation area.

Cuyahoga Valley is the only national park in the state of Ohio and one of three in the Great Lakes Basin, with Isle Royale National Park in Lake Superior and Indiana Dunes National Park bordering Lake Michigan. Cuyahoga Valley also differs from the other national parks in America in that it is adjacent to two large urban areas and it includes a dense road network, small towns, four reservations of the Cleveland Metroparks, eleven parks of the Summit Metro Parks, and public and private attractions.

History

Indigenous history 
No Native American tribes currently have federal recognition in Ohio; however, the former inhabitants of the Cuyahoga Valley were Native Americans. The Wyandot, Iroquois, Ottawa, Objibwe, Munsee, Potawatomi, Miami, Catawba, and Shawnee all lived in or traversed this area, but the Lenapé Nation, also known as the Lenape’wàk or Delaware Nation, are considered "the Grandfathers" of many Native Nations of the upper Ohio River Valley. They had a democratic and egalitarian sociopolitical structure where leaders (sachem) consulted elders who advocated for the expectations of the people before decisions were made. The Lenapé were actively involved in long-distance trade networks and were highly skilled at creating goods and art such as pottery, stone weaponry, clothing, and baskets. Wars, coercive treaties, and legislative changes in the eighteenth and nineteenth centuries resulted in Lenapé movement both west and south from their geographic origins in present-day New York City, the lower Hudson Valley, eastern Pennsylvania, New Jersey, and northern Delaware, through the Ohio River Valley and Cuyahoga Valley, to current residencies primarily in Oklahoma and Ontario, Canada.
Land was vitally important to the Lenapé Nation. The fur trade required large hunting grounds, as did agriculture, which served as their central food source. As the Lenapé Nation was pushed west, ecological consistencies between present-day Pennsylvania and Ohio allowed them to continue similar agricultural, hunting, and fishing practices; however, as treaties and violent conflicts continued, the Lenapé were not permitted sufficient time to develop a relationship with land in the Ohio River Valley. While being pushed west, the Lenapé turned to each other to form alliances between Lenapé communities to preserve culture, territory, and resources.

The Lenapé’s hunting practices changed with the introduction of the fur trade. After contact with Europeans, the emphasis on hunting began to shift towards the demands of fur production rather than prioritizing sustainability. Because of this shift in Lenapé hunting practices, the populations of beavers and other fur-bearing animals plummeted. These trade networks depended on waterways used by indigenous people through the seventeenth and eighteenth centuries:

Portage Path was located in modern-day Summit County, Ohio. The trail connected the Cuyahoga and Tuscarawas Rivers and was approximately eight miles in length. American Indians used this path to transport their canoes overland from one river to the other. Using canoes, American Indians could travel by water from the Great Lakes to the Gulf of Mexico except for this small section. Today, most of the path is located in the city of Akron, Ohio, although interested parties can follow signs that trace the path between the two rivers. Portage County received its name from Portage Path.

Treaties and conflict 

The Cuyahoga Valley is no longer inhabited by the Lenapé Nation primarily due to coercive legislative processes and numerous violent conflicts. The 1795 Treaty of Greenville set the Cuyahoga River as the boundary between indigenous peoples' lands and European settlement. In 1805,  of land, including the present-day Cuyahoga Valley National Park, was ceded in the Treaty of Fort Industry with a promise of a thousand dollar annual payout to each Native Nation that lost land (the Wyandot, Ottawa, Objibwe, Munsee, Lenapé, Potawatomi, and Shawnee). The treaty also included a clause that allowed for the continuation of indigenous hunting on the ceded land; however, that portion of the treaty was neglected in practice. Other treaties, also took Lenapé land without their full knowledge or consent. Today, the Lenapé Nation is more commonly referred to as the Delaware Nation and has its headquarters in Oklahoma, although there are also populations in Kansas, Wisconsin, and Ontario, Canada, as well as in their ancestral homelands, including Pennsylvania, New Jersey, and Delaware.

Later history 
The valley began providing recreation for urban dwellers in the 1870s when people came from nearby cities for carriage rides or leisure boat trips along the canal. In 1880, the Valley Railway became another way to escape urban industrial life. Actual park development began in the 1910s and 1920s with the establishment of Cleveland and Akron metropolitan park districts. In 1929, the estate of Cleveland businessman Hayward Kendall donated  around the Ritchie Ledges and a trust fund to the state of Ohio. Kendall's will stipulated that the "property should be perpetually used for park purposes". The area was called Virginia Kendall Park, in honor of his mother. In the 1930s, the Civilian Conservation Corps built much of the park's infrastructure including the Happy Days Lodge and the shelters at Octagon, the Ledges, and Kendall Lake. The Happy Days Lodge, near Peninsula, was constructed from 1938 to 1939 as a camp for urban children. The lodge is presently used only as a special events site.

National Park Service 
Although the regional parks safeguarded certain places, by the 1960s local citizens feared that urban sprawl would overwhelm the Cuyahoga Valley's natural beauty. An additional concern was the environmental degradation of the Cuyahoga River via factory waste and sewage, along with fires that burned on the river in 1952 and 1969. Citizens joined forces with state and national government staff to find a long-term solution. Finally, on December 27, 1974, President Gerald Ford signed the bill establishing the Cuyahoga Valley National Recreation Area, even as the administration recommended a veto because "The Cuyahoga Valley possesses no qualities which qualify it for inclusion in the National Park System" and the government was already providing funds for outdoor recreation.

The National Park Service acquired the  Krejci Dump in 1985 to include as part of the recreation area. They requested a thorough analysis of the site's contents from the Environmental Protection Agency. After the survey identified extremely toxic materials, the area was closed in 1986 and designated a superfund site under the Comprehensive Environmental Response, Compensation and Liability Act (CERCLA) of 1980. Litigation was filed against potentially responsible parties: Ford, GM, Chrysler, 3M, Waste Management, Chevron, Kewanee Industries, and Federal Metals. Only 3M would not agree to a settlement, and the company lost at trial.

The area was redesignated a national park by Congress on October 11, 2000, with the passage of the Department of the Interior and Related Agencies Appropriations Act, 2001, House Bill 4578, 106th Congress. The park is administered by the National Park Service. The David Berger National Memorial in Beachwood, a Cleveland suburb, is also managed through Cuyahoga Valley National Park.

The Richfield Coliseum, a multipurpose arena in the Cuyahoga River area, was demolished in 1999 and the vacant site became part of Cuyahoga Valley National Park upon its designation in 2000. The area has since become a grassy meadow that is a popular birdwatching site.

Wildlife
Animals found in the park include raccoons, muskrats, coyotes, skunks, red foxes, beavers, peregrine falcons, river otters, bald eagles, opossums, three species of moles, white-tailed deer, Canada geese, gray foxes, minks, great blue herons, and seven species of bats.

Climate

According to the Köppen climate classification system, the Boston Mill Visitor Center at Cuyahoga Valley National Park has a hot-summer humid continental climate (Köppen climate classificationDfa).

Attractions 

Cuyahoga Valley features natural, man-made, and private attractions, which is unusual for an American national park. The park includes compatible-use sites not owned by the federal government, such as regional parks of the Cleveland Metroparks and Summit Metro Parks systems.

The natural areas include forests, rolling hills, narrow ravines, wetlands, rivers, and waterfalls. The Ledges are a rock outcropping that provides a westward view across the valley's wooded areas. Talus caves are located among the boulders in the forest around the Ledges.

The park has many trails, most notably the  Towpath Trail, which follows a former stretch of the  Ohio and Erie Canal and is popular for hiking, bicycling, and running. Skiing and sled-riding are available during the winter at Kendall Hills. Visitors can play golf, or take scenic excursions and railroad tours on the Cuyahoga Valley Scenic Railroad during special events.

The park also features preserved and restored displays of 19th and early 20th century sustainable farming and rural living, most notably the Hale Farm and Village, while catering to contemporary cultural interests with art exhibits, outdoor concerts, and theater performances in venues such as Blossom Music Center and Kent State University's Porthouse Theatre. In the mid-1980s, the park hosted the National Folk Festival.

Ohio and Erie Canal Towpath Trail 

The multi-purpose Ohio and Erie Canal Towpath Trail was developed by the National Park Service and is the major trail through Cuyahoga Valley National Park. The trail traverses almost  from Rockside Road in Independence in the north to Summit County's Bike & Hike trail in the south, following the Cuyahoga River for much of its length. Restrooms are available at several trailheads, and food and drink establishments are along Rockside Road, as well as the Boston Store in Peninsula, and at the seasonal farmer's market on Botzum Road. Three visitor centers are located along the path: the Canal Exploration Center, Boston Store, and the Hunt House. The Summit County trail continues through Akron and further south through Stark and Tuscarawas counties to Zoar, Ohio, almost  continuously, with a single  interruption. Sections of the towpath trail outside of Cuyahoga Valley National Park are owned and maintained by various state and local agencies. The trail also meets the Buckeye Trail in the national park near Boston Store. Another section of the Summit County Bike & Hike Trail system is nearby, connecting to Brandywine Falls, Cleveland Metroparks' Bedford Reservation and the cities of Solon in Cuyahoga County, Hudson and Stow in Summit County, and Kent and Ravenna in Portage County.

Seasonally, the Cuyahoga Valley Scenic Railroad (CVSR) allows visitors to travel along the towpath from Rockside Road to Akron, embarking or disembarking at any of the stops along the way. The train is especially popular with bicyclists, and for viewing and photographing fall colors. CVSR is independently owned and operated.

History 

The Towpath Trail follows the historic route of the Ohio and Erie Canal. Before the canal was built, Ohio was a sparsely settled wilderness where travel was difficult and getting crops to market was nearly impossible. The canal, built between 1825 and 1832, provided a new transportation route from Cleveland on Lake Erie, to Portsmouth on the Ohio River. The canal connected Ohio to the rest of the eastern United States. Numerous wayside exhibits provide information about canal features and sites of historic interest.

Visitors can walk or ride along the same path that the mules used to tow the canal boats loaded with goods and passengers. The scene is different than it was then; the canal was full of water carrying a steady flow of boats. Evidence of beavers can be seen in many places along the trail.

Stanford House (formerly Stanford Hostel) 
Located in the scenic Cuyahoga Valley near Peninsula, Stanford House is a historic 19th-century farm home built in the 1830s by George Stanford, one of the first settlers in the Western Reserve. In 1978, the NPS purchased the property to serve as a youth hostel in conjunction with the American Youth Hostels (AYH) organization. In March 2011, Stanford Hostel became Stanford House, Cuyahoga Valley National Park's first in-park lodging facility. The home was renovated by the Conservancy for Cuyahoga Valley National Park and the National Park Service.

Towpath trailheads 

Within the national park, trailhead parking for the towpath trail is available along Canal Road, from north to south, at:
 Lock 39—west of intersection with Rockside Road; 
 Canal Exploration Center—at Hillside Road; 
 Frazee House—south of Alexander Road, north of Sagamore Road; 
and along Riverview Road, from north to south, at:
 Station Road Bridge—east along with Chippewa Creek Drive; 
 Red Lock—east of the river, along Vaughn/Highland Road; 
 Boston Store—east on Boston Mills Road; 
Peninsula Depot—east across river on Route 303, then N Locust Street, and W Mill Street to parking lot; 
 Lock 28—also called Deep Lock; south of Major Road; 
 Hunt House—at Bolanz Road; 
 Ira Road—just north of intersection; 
Botzum station—south of Bath Road; .

Geology

The "V" course of the Cuyahoga River is rather unusual, first flowing southwest, and then abruptly turning north to drain into Lake Erie not far from its origin. The left arm of this "V", flowing north through the park, corresponds to an older preglacial valley, while the right arm corresponds to relatively new drainage. The new segment cut into the old at Cuyahoga Falls, the base of the "V". Other streams have made routes into the Cuyahoga preglacial valley by cutting gorges with waterfalls such as those found along the Tinkers, Brandywine and Chippewa Creeks. These waterfalls form as flowing water erodes the Bedford Shale, which underlies the more resistant Berea Sandstone. This fill is very complex due to ponding in front of the ice before and after each glaciation. Beach deposits, gravel bars and other shoreline deposits from Lake Maumee are found in the valley, as are gravels from the time of Lake Arkona, and ridges marking the shores of Lake Whittlesey, Lake Warren, and Lake Wayne.

A noticeable remnant of the Wisconsin glaciation is the Defiance moraine, which trends from Defiance in western Ohio, across the state into Pennsylvania. As Cushing et al. point out, "The Defiance moraine represents the last notable stand of the glacial front in this region." Kames and eskers mark the terrain south of this moraine up to the southern extent of the glaciation.

The Berea Sandstone and the Bedford Shale were deposited in a river delta environment in the Lower Mississippian. River channels were incised into the Bedford Shale and subsequently these channels were filled by the Berea Sandstone. Besides setting the stage for majestic gorges and waterfalls within the valley, they have provided an economic use as well. The Berea Sandstone was quarried in Berea for grindstones and building stones, while the lowermost part of the Bedford Shale was quarried in South Euclid and Cleveland Heights for its bluestone.

The Sharon Conglomerate is a Lower Pennsylvanian formation composed of sandstone and conglomerate which forms, according to Cushing et al., "disconnected patches or outliers that cap the highest hills... these outliers stand boldly above the surrounding country" due to its resistance to erosion. The Boston Ledges are the most noteworthy example. As the Mississippian shale underneath is washed away, huge blocks of the Sharon result from the settling. As Cushing et al. explain, "frost action aids in pushing these blocks apart, cracks are widened into caves, and a tangle of blocks results, separated by passages of uneven widths."

A gas boom occurred in 1914–1915, and by 1931, several hundred gas wells were producing from the Devonian Huron shale. As Cushing et al. pointed out in the 1930s, "there are vast amounts of petroleum in the Devonian shales." Since then, the Marcellus Shale and the deeper Utica Shale have shown their economic potential.

Visitor centers 
The Canal Exploration Center is located along Canal Road at Hillside Road in Valley View, south of Rockside Road. The visitor center contains interactive maps and games related to the history of the canal, especially the years from 1825 to 1876. The canal-era building once served canal boat passengers waiting to pass through the Ohio and Erie Canal's Lock 38.

Boston Store was constructed in 1836 and is located just east of Riverview Road. The building was used as a warehouse, store, post office, and a general gathering place. The visitor center has a museum featuring exhibits on canal boat-building. A short video is available, as well as maps, brochures and NPS passport stamps.

The Hunt House at Riverview and Bolanz Roads is typical of late-19th-century family farms in the Cuyahoga Valley. Visitors can obtain information about park activities and see exhibits about the area's agricultural history. The farm is an ideal starting point for a hike or a bicycle ride as it is adjacent to the canal towpath trail.

The Frazee House on Canal Road in Valley View south of Rockside Road was constructed from 1825 to 1826, during the same years the northern section of the canal was dug. The house is a fine example of a Western Reserve home and features exhibits relating to architectural styles, construction techniques, and the Frazee family.

Points of historic interest

National Register of Historic Places

All properties listed here are open to the public, though some in a limited way—see Status column. Many of the NRHP sites found in the full list are in private ownership and are not listed here.

See also
List of birds of Cuyahoga Valley National Park
List of national parks of the United States

References

Notes

Bibliography

Further reading 
Cuyahoga Valley Trails Council (2007). The Trail Guide to Cuyahoga Valley National Park, 3rd Edition, OH: Gray & Company, Publishers.

External links 

  of the National Park Service
 Conservancy for Cuyahoga Valley National Park
 Cuyahoga Valley Scenic Railroad
 Hit the Rails for the Best Cuyahoga Valley Experience – a National Geographic Cuyahoga Valley Scenic Railroad article

 
Protected areas of Cuyahoga County, Ohio
Protected areas of Summit County, Ohio
Protected areas established in 1974
Civilian Conservation Corps in Ohio
Ohio and Erie Canalway National Heritage Area
2000 establishments in Ohio
1974 establishments in Ohio
National parks in Ohio